Iceland competed at the 1956 Summer Olympics in Melbourne, Australia.  Vilhjálmur Einarsson won the first ever Olympic medal for his country.

Medalists

Results by event

Athletics

Men
Track & road events

Field events

References
Official Olympic Reports
International Olympic Committee results database

Nations at the 1956 Summer Olympics
1956
Summer Olympics